Goran Čengić (21 April 1946 – 14 June 1992) was a Yugoslav handball player who played for RK Bosna Sarajevo, RK Mlada Bosna, RK Crvena zvezda and the Yugoslavia national handball team.

Early life
He was born in Sarajevo, PR Bosnia and Herzegovina, FPR Yugoslavia in 1946 to Ferid "Fićo" (1910–1986) and Nataša (née Zimonjić).

Both of his parents were Yugoslav Partisans in World War II. His father, Ferid Čengić, served in Sarajevo's Partisan municipal committee and in the city council and later was mayor of Sarajevo from 1947 to 1948. His mother was a descendant of the old Serbian Orthodox family of Zimonjić from Herzegovina. The brother of his mother's grandfather was Orthodox bishop Petar Zimonjić, who was killed by Croat Ustashe in 1941 and was later canonized by the Serbian Orthodox Church as a saint.

In 1963, at the age of 17, while playing for RK Bosna Sarajevo he helped win the Yugoslav Handball Cup. Čengić completed his studies at the Academy of Fine Arts at the University of Sarajevo.

Death
Čengić was killed on 14 June 1992 by Veselin Vlahović after he tried to protect his Bosniak neighbor, Husnija Ćerimagić. Nine years after his murder, Čengić's remains were found and interred in Sarajevo's Bare Cemetery. In 2006, RK Bosna Sarajevo began holding the Goran Čengić Memorial Tournament in his honor. In 2013, he was posthumously awarded the Duško Kondor Civil Courage Award. Former Croatian president Stjepan Mesić presented the award to Čengić's son Vladimir.

References

Sources
 
 
 
 
 

1946 births
1992 deaths
Sportspeople from Sarajevo
Yugoslav male handball players
Bosnia and Herzegovina male handball players
RK Crvena zvezda players
University of Sarajevo alumni
Civilians killed in the Bosnian War
Burials at Bare Cemetery, Sarajevo